The 1993–94 Cypriot Second Division was the 39th season of the Cypriot second-level football league. Aris won their 3rd title.

Format
Fourteen teams participated in the 1993–94 Cypriot Second Division. All teams played against each other twice, once at their home and once away. The team with the most points at the end of the season crowned champions. The first team were promoted to 1994–95 Cypriot First Division. The last five teams were relegated to the 1994–95 Cypriot Third Division.

The 2nd-placed team faced the 11th-placed team of the 1993–94 Cypriot First Division, in a two-legged relegation play-off for one spot in the 1994–95 Cypriot First Division. The 9th-placed team faced the 2nd-placed team of the 1993–94 Cypriot Third Division, in a two-legged relegation play-off for one spot in the 1994–95 Cypriot Second Division.

Changes from previous season
Teams promoted to 1993–94 Cypriot First Division
 Omonia Aradippou
 APEP

Teams relegated from 1992–93 Cypriot First Division
 Aris Limassol
 APOP Paphos

Teams promoted from 1992–93 Cypriot Third Division
 AEZ Zakakiou
 Ermis Aradippou

Teams relegated to 1993–94 Cypriot Third Division
 Digenis Akritas Morphou
 THOI Lakatamia

League standings

Playoff

Promotion playoff
The 2nd-placed team, APOP Paphos, faced the 11th-placed team of the 1993–94 Cypriot First Division, Olympiakos Nicosia, in a two-legged relegation play-off for one spot in the 1994–95 Cypriot First Division. Olympiakos won both matches and secured their place in the 1994–95 Cypriot First Division.

APOP 2–3 Olympiakos
Olympiakos 2–0 APOP

Relegation playoff
The 9th-placed team, Doxa Katokopias, faced the 2nd-placed team of the 1993–94 Cypriot Third Division, Achyronas Liopetriou, in a two-legged relegation play-off for one spot in the 1994–95 Cypriot Second Division. Doxa won both matches and secured their place in the 1994–95 Cypriot Second Division.

Achyronas Liopetriou 1–2 Doxa
Doxa 4–1 Achyronas Liopetriou

See also
 Cypriot Second Division
 1993–94 Cypriot First Division
 1993–94 Cypriot Cup

Sources

Cypriot Second Division seasons
Cyprus
1993–94 in Cypriot football